Hana Moataz, also known as Hana Ayoub (born 21 March 2000 in Giza) is an Egyptian professional squash player. As of April 2021, she was ranked number 75 in the world.

References

2000 births
Living people
Egyptian female squash players
21st-century Egyptian women